Fauzi Baadilla (born 25 September 1979) is an Egyptian-born Indonesian actor and model. He appeared as Damar in Mengejar Matahari, directed by Rudy Soedjarwo, a role for which he won "Best Supporting Role Actor" at the 2005 Bandung Film Festival.

Career 
He began his career in 2000 as a model for advertisements and videos. In 2004, he starred in the movie Mengejar Matahari and since then has starred in 9 Naga, Tentang Dia, Rindu Kami Padamu, Coklat Stroberi and many more. He played very great as lead role in "Lost in Papua" (2011) and "Sebelum Pagi Terulang Kembali" (2014). In the beginning of 2016, he appeared in three Indonesian drama movie : "I Am Hope", "ISENg", and "Dreams".

He has also appeared in soap operas such as Dunia Tanpa Koma and Keajaiban Cinta with Primus Yustisio. He worked in music videos for the singers Shanty and Sania and as a presenter in television programs such as Nikmatnya Dunia, Wisata Malam, and Ride with Pride.

In June 2011, he and Kinaryosih received an invitation from the South Korean national broadcaster, KBS to appear in Let's Go! Dream Team Season 2.

In 2013, he was named as a tourism ambassador for Indonesia.

Personal life 
He was married an Uzbekistan model, Senk Lotta, on January 23, 2007. They divorced in 2010. Baadilla prefers to keep a low profile in the media. He has been one of activist against Jaringan Islam Liberal and recently become part of Warrior of Hope (activist for raising awareness and care of people with cancer). Currently he has been living in Bogor, West Java. In 2015 he was appointed as brand ambassador for Banda Neira island.

Filmography

Film

Television

Video clip

References

External links 
 

1979 births
Egyptian emigrants to Indonesia
Indonesian male film actors
Indonesian male television actors
Indonesian male models
Indonesian people of Arab descent
Male actors from Cairo
Living people